Stefan Nenadović (born 4 January 1991) is a Montenegrin footballer who plays for Italian side Vertovese.

Club career
Born in Titograd, capital of Montenegro during the breakup of SFR Yugoslavia and Yugoslav Wars, Nenadović moved to Italy at young age. He played for Inter's Giovanissimi Nazionali team and won the league champion in 2006. In 2007, he left Inter's Allievi Regionali team and signed a youth contract with Monza. Since 2008–09 season, Inter either sold or loaned several players to Monza and reunited with Nenadović. With former Inter players formed the backbone of Monza's Berretti team, they finished as the league runner-up. He also played once for the first team in January 2010. He was released on 16 July 2010. He then signed by OFK Bar. He later played in the Italian lower leagues.

He holds both Serbian and Montenegrin citizenships.

International career
He capped 5 times for Montenegro U19 team, all in friendlies (Macedonia, Greece (twice) Serbia, and Belgium).

Honours
Champion
Campionato Giovanissimi Nazionali: 2006 (Inter youth)
Runner-up
Campionato Nazionale Dante Berretti: 2009 (Monza youth)

References

External links
 FA of Montenegro Profile 

1991 births
Living people
Footballers from Podgorica
Association football midfielders
Montenegrin footballers
Montenegro youth international footballers
Inter Milan players
A.C. Monza players
OFK Bar players
Promozione players
Eccellenza players
Serie D players
Montenegrin expatriate footballers
Expatriate footballers in Italy
Montenegrin expatriate sportspeople in Italy